Ryan Mphahlele (born 20 June 1998) is a South African middle and long-distance runner.

In 2017, he competed in the junior men's race at the 2017 IAAF World Cross Country Championships held in Kampala, Uganda.

In 2019, he competed in the senior men's race at the 2019 IAAF World Cross Country Championships held in Aarhus, Denmark. He finished in 70th place.

References

External links 
 

Living people
1998 births
Place of birth missing (living people)
South African male long-distance runners
South African male middle-distance runners
South African male cross country runners
20th-century South African people
21st-century South African people